The 2001–02 season was the 78th season in the history of Rayo Vallecano and the club's third consecutive season in the top flight of Spanish football. In addition to the domestic league, Rayo Vallecano participated in this season's edition of the Copa del Rey.

Pre-season and friendlies

Competitions

Overall record

La Liga

League table

Results summary

Results by round

Matches

Copa del Rey

References

Rayo Vallecano seasons
Rayo Vallecano